Al-Fayhaa TV is an independent Arabic television channel broadcasting from Suleymaniyah, Iraq and is owned by Mohammad Al-Tay. The channel was founded on July 25, 2004. The channel broadcasts news and political and cultural programming with a Shia Islam-leniency, but liberal.

References

External links
 Official Website

Iraqi companies established in 2004
Television channels and stations established in 2004
Television stations in Iraq
Mass media in Sulaymaniyah
Mass media companies established in 2004